Birdsnest coral may refer to several different species of coral:

 species of the genus Seriatopora
 species of the genus Stylophora (coral)